Clinidium jamaicense is a species of ground beetle in the subfamily Rhysodinae. It was described by Gilbert John Arrow in 1942. It is endemic to Jamaica. Clinidium jamaicense measure  in length.

References

Clinidium
Beetles of North America
Insects of Jamaica
Endemic fauna of Jamaica
Beetles described in 1942
Taxa named by Gilbert John Arrow